Swails is a surname. Notable people with the name include:

Marsha Swails (born 1952), American teacher and politician from Minnesota
Stephen Atkins Swails (1832–1900), black Union Army officer and politician from South Carolina

See also
 Swail, surname
 Swale (disambiguation)